This is a complete list of ice hockey players who have played for the Carolina Hurricanes in the National Hockey League (NHL). It includes players that have played at least one match, either in the NHL regular season or in the NHL playoffs. This list does not include players from the Hartford Whalers of the NHL (1979–80 to 1996–97) and New England Whalers of the WHA (1972–73 to 1978–79).

Key
  Appeared in a Canes game during the 2021–2022 season.
  Stanley Cup Champion, Hockey Hall of Famer, or retired number.

The "Seasons" column lists the first year of the season of the player's first game and the last year of the season of the player's last game. For example, a player who played one game in the 2000–2001 season would be listed as playing with the team from 2000–2001, regardless of what calendar year the game occurred within.

Statistics complete as of the 2021–2022 NHL season.

Goaltenders

Skaters

References

Footnotes

See also
List of NHL players

 
Carolina
players